Elections to Nuneaton and Bedworth Borough Council were held on 4 May 2006. Half of the council was up for election and the Labour Party retained control of the council.

After the election, the composition of the council was

 Labour 18
 Conservative 15
 Liberal Democrat 1

Election results

Ward results

2006
2006 English local elections
2000s in Warwickshire